Elkin is a town in Surry and Wilkes counties in the U.S. state of North Carolina, along the Yadkin River.  Elkin shares its name with the surrounding township of Elkin Township.  The population was 4,083 at the 2020 census.

Geography
Elkin is located at  (36.257709, -80.851296).

According to the United States Census Bureau, the town has a total area of 6.3 square miles (16.4 km2), of which 6.2 square miles (16.2 km2)  is land and 0.1 square mile (0.2 km2)  (1.10%) is water.

Elkin is approximately 15 minutes south of Stone Mountain State Park, and 20 minutes from the entrance of the Blue Ridge Parkway off  Hwy 21 (heading towards Sparta). Elkin enjoys mild weather patterns and extremely clean air. Its downtown is also situated along the Yadkin River, and offers a paddlers boat ramp and small camp site. Six local outfitters provide supplies for anyone interested in floating on the Yadkin to or from Elkin.

There are also numerous vineyards in the Yadkin Valley area (over 40 in and around Elkin), and the Yadkin Valley Wine Festival is held each May at the Elkin Municipal Park, which is situated along Big Elkin Creek, a tributary of the Yadkin River.  Elkin is centrally located in the Yadkin Valley Wine Region (a certified American Viticulture Area). Elkin has also has two microbreweries and hosts a craft brewery festival each fall in called The Big Elkin Brewfest. It is held  in the Municipal Park, which was a mustering field during the American Revolution. Elkin was the easternmost encampment along Overmountain Victory Trail and there a marker at the park, near the recreation center, along Hwy 268.

Trails are abundant in Elkin, including the Overmountain Victory Trail, the North Carolina Mountains to Sea Trail, and the Yadkin River State Park 'Blue' Trail. Elkin is considered an official Trail Town as the NC MST is now directed into downtown Elkin along Main St. A local volunteer group (elkinvalleytrails.org) is responsible for grooming over 24 miles of the trail from Elkin to Stone Mountain State Park. The group are working on the E&A Rail Trail, which boasts mountain bike trails, walking trails, and trout fishing, all beginning at the Elkin Municipal Park, and there is even a golf cart rental at the Rec Center for handicapped individuals who would like to enjoy the trails.

Demographics

2020 census

As of the 2020 United States census, there were 4,122 people, 1,618 households, and 1,087 families residing in the town.

2000 census
As of the census of 2000, there were 4,109 people, 1,690 households, and 1,051 families residing in the town. The population density was 655.7 people per square mile (253.0/km2). There were 1,854 housing units at an average density of 295.8 per square mile (114.2/km2). The racial makeup of the town was 84.11% White, 7.23% African American, 0.02% Native American, 0.32% Asian, 0.02% Pacific Islander, 6.81% from other races, and 1.48% from two or more races. Hispanic or Latino of any race were 13.43% of the population.

There were 1,690 households, out of which 26.0% had children under the age of 18 living with them, 48.3% were married couples living together, 9.6% had a female householder with no husband present, and 37.8% were non-families. 34.4% of all households were made up of individuals, and 20.1% had someone living alone who was 65 years of age or older. The average household size was 2.32 and the average family size was 2.95.

In the town, the population was spread out, with 22.1% under the age of 18, 7.1% from 18 to 24, 26.8% from 25 to 44, 20.3% from 45 to 64, and 23.6% who were 65 years of age or older. The median age was 40 years. For every 100 females, there were 87.1 males. For every 100 females age 18 and over, there were 82.4 males.

The median income for a household in the town was $31,698, and the median income for a family was $38,667. Males had a median income of $29,514 versus $22,108 for females. The per capita income for the town was $21,123. About 6.3% of families and 12.6% of the population were below the poverty line, including 10.6% of those under age 18 and 18.5% of those age 65 or over.

History
The flowing together of the Yadkin River and Big Elkin Creek has drawn people to the area of what is now Elkin since the coming of the Paleo-Indians 10,000 years ago. The Sioux Indians settled along the Yadkin River as early as 500 BC. The first English colonists came in the mid-eighteenth century along with some colonists from Ireland. Cherokee Indians were also in the area, although the Cherokees had been active in the French and Indian War, they had joined in treaties with the English in 1763, followed by the events of the American Revolution.

Alexander Chatham opened a small woolen mill in 1877 that grew to become Elkin's largest industry for many decades, The Chatham Manufacturing Company. Along with other mills in the area it has dwindled. The Northwestern North Carolina Railroad arrived in 1890; the town was ready to take the opportunities the railroad brought for commercial and industrial expansion. Its strategic location near the Yadkin River and the Big Elkin Creek and as a stop on the railroad caused prosperity that produced brick stores, many industries, and fine houses.

The beginning of industry with the cotton mill, the Civil War involvement, the coming of the railroad, the town's coping with the depression of the Thirties, and the two world wars heavily influenced the town's development. Chatham Manufacturing was famous for making World War II wool blankets for soldiers.  There is a Civil War marker on West Main Street across from the Elkin Library.

The Elkin Municipal Park was the location during the Revolutionary War of a mustering field. Troops gathered to march on the Overmountain Victory Trail towards Wilkesboro then on to Morganton, NC, before they headed south to victory.  There is a viewing site along Hwy 268, just west of the Rec Center that tells the story on an information panel.

Cedar Point, Downtown Elkin Historic District, Gwyn Avenue-Bridge Street Historic District, and the Hugh Chatham Memorial Hospital, (former) are listed on the National Register of Historic Places.

Cruising and Annual Festivals
Elkin had the biggest cruising community on the east coast during the 1960s, 1970s, and 1980s. USA Today once featured Elkin and its cruisers on the front page of the national newspaper. However, a crackdown by local police in the late 1990s temporarily ended the once-vibrant weekend cruising scene, leaving downtown Elkin deserted on weekend nights until cruising returned to downtown Elkin on Saturday, October 10, 2009 for the first time in almost 20 years. A fundraiser was held to raise money to restore the historic Reeves Theater in downtown Elkin. For a $5 donation, participants would be given a decal for their car and then be allowed to cruise the former downtown cruising loop. Many people both young and old participated, with many parents who were cruisers in their younger days bringing their children out to show them how much fun downtown Elkin used to be.

Since 2012, Cruise! events have become a summertime monthly event and continue each year. Cruise events involve parking along Main Street as well as cruising around the downtown streets. Events are scheduled May through October each year. Many shops and restaurants stay open late for the crowds. The event starts at 4 pm and lasts till around 9 pm.

Elkin is also famous for the annual festivals and regional events that offer fun for all ages and interests:
Yadkin Valley Wine Festival (3rd weekend in May),
NC Trails Days (first weekend in June),
Elkin Roots Music Fest (mid-late June),
Take a Break from the Interstate 100-yard Road Market (last weekend in July),
Reevestock Music Fest (first weekend in August),
Yadkin Valley Pumpkin Festival on Main Street during the 4th Saturday in September. Record-breaking pumpkin and watermelon weigh-in's during this all day long family event which also includes a car show, quilt show, music, kids play areas, farmers market, and more; and finally 
Light up Elkin and holiday parade (first weekend in December)

Education
Elkin is served by the Elkin City Schools system. It currently ranks among the top 5 schools in North Carolina. It operates an elementary school (grades 1–6) with a population of approximately 700, a middle school (grades 7–8) and Elkin High School (grades 9–12) with approximately 384 students. The high school has had new developments made to the building; the construction of the new science, math, and CTE programs completed in the 2006–2007 school year, and the English and history building completed in 2011. Elkin will incorporate the STEAM program throughout all grades K-12. (Science, Technology, Engineering, Art, Math).

Elkin High School athletics is one of the most renowned 1A programs in the state. The football program captured state titles in 2002, 2003, 2005, and 2006. They also won one in 1967 as a 3A program. Elkin High has also produced numerous fencing, soccer, volleyball, tennis, swimming, and wrestling state championships.

Transport

Highways
Interstate 77 passes along the eastern side of Elkin. Exit 85 provides the midpoint entrance into Elkin via Hwy 268, or CC Camp Road.

North Carolina Highway 67 You can also enter Elkin by exiting off NC 67 (exit 82 at Jonesville), then heading west on NC 67 until crossing over the Yadkin River (this becomes old Business Hwy 21). At this point, you'll be entering the historic downtown district at Elkin's southern border where you'll find a bustling pedestrian friendly Main Street, with restaurants, antiques, a winery/tasting room, shops, Civil War Marker, Overmountain Victory Trail, NC Mountain-to-Sea Trail (Main Street), and a future visitor center.

U.S. Route 21  (US 21)passes through Elkin. Old Business Hwy 21 is also called Bridge Street, and intersects the entire town of Elkin from the Yadkin River up to where it joins with US 21 heading north towards State Road, then to Sparta. US 21 is the route travelers would take to access North Carolina's Stone Mountain State Park. Elkin is the best place to stock up on supplies for hikers and campers heading to Stone Mountain.  There is also a new RV campground in Elkin off of US 21 called Byrd's Branch Campground, which opened in 2015. Campers looking to locate closer to evening activities and amenities may wish to look into this location, if the campgrounds at the park are filled.

Airports
The town is served by Elkin Municipal Airport.  Ground transportation is also available. 
Aircraft Maintenance is available Along with Fixed Wing and Rotorcraft flight instruction.

Commercial flights are available through Piedmont Triad International Airport in Greensboro and Charlotte Douglas International Airport.

Local media

Print
The Tribune, a community newspaper published on Mondays, Wednesdays and Fridays, provides coverage of Elkin as well as nearby Jonesville and parts of Wilkes County and Yadkin County. The Winston-Salem Journal and Mount Airy News, larger daily newspapers, also cover Surry County.

Broadcast
WIFM 100.9 FM radio station broadcasts from 813 N. Bridge Street in Elkin.

Elkin is part of the Piedmont Triad radio and television market, but many broadcasts from the Charlotte market also can be received.

Notable people
 Richard Thurmond Chatham, former member of the U.S. House of Representatives
 Barney Hall, former NASCAR sports commentator
 James A. Harrell III, former member of the North Carolina General Assembly
 Jeff Hayes, NFL punter, Super Bowl XVII champion with Washington Redskins
 Thomas F. Metz, retired lieutenant general in the United States Army
 Jim Popp, American sports executive
 Jerry Steele, former college basketball player and head coach, and athletic administrator
 Bob Stinson, MLB switch-hitting catcher

See also
 List of municipalities in North Carolina

References

External links

 
 Yadkin Valley Chamber of Commerce

Towns in Surry County, North Carolina
Towns in Wilkes County, North Carolina
Towns in North Carolina